W.T. Blackwell & Co. Tobacco was a tobacco manufacturer in Durham, North Carolina.  It was best known as the original producer of Bull Durham Tobacco, the first nationally marketed brand of tobacco products in the United States.  The Blackwell tobacco factory in Durham, built in 1874, was declared a National Historic Landmark in 1977.  It is included in the American Tobacco Company Manufacturing Plant historic district, and is now occupied by apartments.

History
During the occupation of Durham by various military forces in the American Civil War, the quality of some of its tobacco was recognized.  Former soldiers sought to acquire the tobacco produced by John Ruffin Green, who created the Bull Durham logo.  Green in 1868 partnered with William T. Blackwell, who after Green's death formed a partnership with Julian S. Carr to continue producing and marketing the brand.  The company experienced rapid growth, due in part to one of the nation's first nationwide advertising campaigns, which made the Bull Durham logo widely recognizable.  The Bull Durham brand continued, through ownership changes, until 1988.

Factory
The Blackwell factory, located at the corner of West Pettigrew and Blackwell Streets in Durham, was built in stages between 1874 and 1903. It is a four-story brick building, with commercial Italianate style. The Bull Durham brand was manufactured at this facility until 1957, when its manufacture was transferred to a factory in Richmond, Virginia.

Gallery

See also
List of National Historic Landmarks in North Carolina
National Register of Historic Places listings in Durham County, North Carolina

References

 Blackwell's Durham Tobacco/American Tobacco Co., Open Durham 

National Historic Landmarks in North Carolina
Buildings and structures in Durham, North Carolina
Industrial buildings completed in 1874
Industrial buildings and structures on the National Register of Historic Places in North Carolina
Tobacco buildings in the United States
National Register of Historic Places in Durham County, North Carolina
Historic district contributing properties in North Carolina
1874 establishments in North Carolina